Netmage is an international festival dedicated to electronic art curated by Xing  and produced annually—in the city of Bologna—as a multidisciplinary program of works, investigating and promoting contemporary audiovisual research. The festival was born in 2000 with funds provided by the European Union, when Bologna represented one of the nine major European capital of culture. The festival concentrates on an amalgam of Happenings, environments, and audio/visual installations, it does through a concentration on creative scenes and subcultural communities.

The experience of Netmage (eleven editions from 2001 to 2011) was merged into the annual Live Arts Week.

Mission
The mission of Netmage is to  investigate the relationship between the  "liveness" and the "ambient space".
At the crossroads of these two terms is situated the notion of "post-cinema": defined as an environmental construction capable of gathering widely diverse attitudes in a public space.

Post Cinema/Postmemory It is a cinema made of multi-projections on a number of screens with no seating, a multiplication of narrative traces, possible points of view, physical positions of the spectators; achieving a removal of the forced estrangement of the 20th Century spectator (the darkness of the room, physical and perceptive isolation, a monodirectional viewing perspective) that evoke the world of the first Happenings of the 1960s, the philosophy of expanded cinema, and successive multimedia installation experiments of the 1980s.

"Live Media"

"Live Media is an open-ended term which has come into currency amongst artists and theoreticians. Live-media relates to the gathering of relatively diverse practices capable of calling to mind the wide range of research by video producers, visual artists, musicians, sound artists, VJ's, filmmakers, designers and a range of creative people issued by creative scenes and subcultural communities.
Netmage and its curators have been instrumental in coining and promoting this term.

 utilization of electronic, digital or analogue platforms to generate images and sound;
 interaction consisting of visual and audio elements;
 inclusion of liveness (or randomness) as in any kind of performance.

Playing with stimuli, what is created in the live-media experience is a "privilege of variation" that in the first case goes from designer to public, in the second from public to executor. The confrontation is direct, dictated by the logic of the event.

"Dispositif" (post-cinema) and practice (Live Media) thus represent two types of continuous variation through which Netmage questions possible currents in new media aesthetics, summoning artists and visual operators from diverse disciplines, in a context reminiscent of the Happening.

Despite the complexity born from the exploration of this kind of space, ideal internal space, the  two axes—post-cinema and live media—intertwine and simply state what may be called a gathering, a togetherness of the community of producers, protagonists in the field of contemporary media, who both find themselves isolated; creating then a direct, interdisciplinary confrontation, thus filling a growing gap between hyper-connectivity on one hand, physical and social experience on the other.

History
The first edition of the festival was born in an historic watershed with a view on one side from the experiences of one of the last bastions of the Twentieth Century avantgarde, video art, and on the other toward a new front that was as yet undefined while the entire world of research visual production was poised to turn fully digital.

In the field of music, the 1990s had already anticipated a great deal of what was later to come in the visual world, pointing the way to a radical transformation in techniques, languages and methods of cultural consumption. Netmage, different from a number of other festivals dedicated to electronics born in the world of clubbing, has concentrated on the production of images, imagination and universal vision.
In eleven editions Netmage has produced and hosted over two hundred projects from over thirty countries (including Europe, Asia, The Americas, Oceania) offering a smattering of the most recent evolutions in the technological imagination and multiple currents.
Follows the list of the guests of the festival (Nationality follows standard notation)

Netmage 2001
Venues:
Link • Hangar del  mercato Ortofrutticolo • Teatro Testoni • Rifugio Antiaereo Giardini del Guasto • Salara • Ex Scuderie di Palazzo Paleotti

Artists:
 
 Yann Beauvais/Thomas Köner (FR/DE) Quatr'un
 Alexander Hahn(US) Memory of Present
 Granular synthesis (AU) POL
 Studio Azzurro (IT) Landing Talk
 Romeo Castellucci (IT) Mene Tekel Peres
 Umberto Bignardi/Alvin Curran (IT) Ritorno alla città
 Kinkaleri (IT) Esso
 Pansonic (FI)
 Cold Cut/Hexstatic (GB) Vision Live
 Mika Vainio (FI)
 Jurgen Reble (DE)

Netmage 2002
Venue:
Scuderie Bentivoglio

Artists:
 

 Reel Crew/Dj Seam (GB)
 Mordka/ Jake Mandell (US)
 Visual Kitchen Vsw/Styrofoam (BE)
 Sun Wu-Kung (IT)
 Lleuchtmittell (II_II)/Bernd Karner (DE)
 Visomat Inc./Dj Shake (DE)
 Norscq presented by Batofar-Paris (FR)
 Ogino Knauss (IT)
 Karø Goldt/Rashim (AT)
 VDJ Safy Sniper (DE/IL)
 Qubo Gas (FR)
 J-Star screening by Onedotzero (GB)
 Farmers manual (AT)
 Dat Politics presented by Batofar-Paris (FR)
 Mouts (IT) Room 101

Netmage 2003
Venues:
Hangar dlF • Raum  • Teatro San Leonardo

Artists:
 
 Tim Etchells (Forced Entertainment) (UK) DownTime, Taxonomy(Death Stories), Everything
 Christian Fennesz/Claudio Sinatti (AU/IT) Far From Here
 Cane Capovolto (IT) Stereo #1
 Otolab (IT)
 Mikomikona (DE)
 Mordka (US)
 Monitor Automatique (DE)
 Teatrino Clandestino (IT) Prima l'immagine e poi il titolo
 Superstereo/BHF feat. Patrick Tuttofuoco
 n:ja/Dietmar Schwarzler
 D-Fuse (DE) Gravity
 Bas Van Koolwijk (NL)
 KMH (DE)
 Ogino Knauss (IT)
 Semiconductor (UK)
 General Magic & Pita Feat. Tina Frank
 Qubo Gas/Scratch Pet Land Baover (FR) Tit
 Tarwater
 Jollymusic

Netmage 2004 
Venues:
Sala Borsa • Raum  • Cassero

Artists:
 
 The Users (CA)
 Alex Adriaansens (NL) V2
 Mylicon/EN/Domenico Sciajno (IT)
 Skoltz_Kolgen (CA)
 Kim Cascone (US)
 Z_e_l_l_e (Nicola Catalano/Maurizio Martusciello) (IT)
 Radian (AT)
 Fanny & Alexander/Zapruder Filmmakersgroup (IT) Villa Venus (il giardino delle delizie)
 Mille Rechenzentrum (DE) Rechenzentrum
 Strohmann /Bruckmayer/Jade (AT)
 Mugen (Alessandro Canova) (IT)
 Richard Chartier (US)
 Saule (BE)
 Wang Inc./Saul Saguatti (IT) Woods Roads
 Thomas Koner (DE) Banlieue du video
 Philippe Petit (FR)
 Tonne (FR/UK) Soundtoys
 Hanna Kuts/Viktor Dovhalyuk (DE) Akuvido
 Otolab (IT)
 Scanner (UK) 52 Pages
 Thomas Koner/Asmus Tietchens (DE) Kontakt der Junglinge
 Mou, Lips! (IT)
 Tatiana,GGTarantola,BO130,Unz,Microbo,Dario Panzeri,Matteo Mariano (IT) Un'impurità non calcolata
 Tonne (UK)
 Teamtendo (FR)
 Little Fluffy Luke (Gianluca Tinarelli) (IT)
 Francesco del Garda (IT)
 Emmanuel Gonay/Xavier Garcia-Bardon

Netmage 2005
Venues:
Auditorium Teatro Manzoni • Galleria Accursio  • Cassero

Artists:
 

 Dmitry Gelfand/EvelinaDomnich (RU/US) Cemra Lucida
 [sic]/triPhaze (Jen Morris/Marek Brandt) (CA/DE) Organic Debris
 Greg Davies/Sebastien Roux/Mattia Casalegno (US/FR/IT) Grain Scape (by no.signal)
 Vincent Epplay/Antoine Schmitt (FR/DE) Display Pixel
 Oren Ambarchi/Jon Wozencroft (AU/UK)
 Staalplaat SoundSystem(NL/DE) Yokomono
 Antiopic(US)
 Patrick Fontana/Emeric Aelters/Pierre Ives Fave(FR) Grenze
 Anthony Pateras/Robin Fox (AT)
 Phil Niblock/Thomas Ankersmit (US/NL) (no.signall)
 Pirandelo (Claudio Sinatti/Andrea Gabriele/Marita Cosima) (IT)
 Carlos Giffoni (US)
 Ateleia (james Elliot)/Sadek Bazaraa (US)
 Scape-Berlin
 Ogino Knauss (IT)
 Bas Van Koolwijk/Christian Toonk (NL) RGB
 Jan Jelinek/Karl Kliem (DE) Sound and Images
 Monolake/Deadbeat (DE/CA) Atlant Waves
 Pierpaolo Leo/Claudio Sinatti (IT)
 Ellen Alien (DE)
 Will Guthrie (AUS)

Netmage 2006
Venue:
Palazzo Re Enzo

Artists:
 

 Nico Vascellari/Whit Love (IT) A great Circle #6
 Katherine Liberovskaya/o.blaat (CA/US)
 Molair/Avatam (FR)
 Sinistri++/Andy Simionato & karen Ann Donnachie (IT/AT) The single Unit of Beauty.
 Electric Indigo (AT)
 Qubo Gas (FR) Baover tit
 Cineplexx(Sebastian Litmanovich)/Abe(Alex Beltran) (AR/ES)
 Ministry of Defiance (David Handford) (UK)
 Andrea Dojmi/Port Royal (IT) Education and protection of our children #2
 Arto Lindsay/Dominique Gonzalez Foerster (US/FR) Ipanema Théories
 @c/Lia (PT/AT)
 Boris Debackere/Brecht Debackere (B/NL) Rotor
 Pierpaolo Leo/Claudio Sinatti (IT)
 Carsten Nicolai (DE)
 Lee Van Dowski (CH)
 Remute (DE)
 Ferran Fages/Will Guthrie/Jean-Philippe Gross (ES/AU/FR)
 Arto Lindsay (US) Garden of self regard
 Kurt Hentschläger (AT) Feed
 Carola Spadoni/Zu (IT) Live Through This
 Simone Tosca (IT) Ear
 ZimmerFrei (IT) Study for a portrait

Netmage 2007
Venues:
Palazzo Re Enzo • Cinema Arcobaleno • ArteFiera - Art Cafè (Hall 19) • Teatro Anatomico – Biblioteca Ariostea - Ferrara

Artists:
 

 kinkaleri (IT) Uh!
 Onda/Oren Ambarchi/Alan Licht (JP/AU/US) Cinemage
 John Duncan/Leif Elggren (US/SE) Something Like Seeing In The Dark
 Emiliano Montanari, David Lynch, Angelo Badalamenti, Trentemøller feat. DJ T.O.M., Enrico Ghezzi, Asja Bettin, and shortcircuits with Thomas Pynchon, Paul Virilio, Hideo Kojima Eyerophany
 Studio Brutus/Citrullo Int./Taxonomy (IT) H2O
 Kjersti Sundland/Anne Bang-Steinsvik (NO) Monstrous Little Women
 Carlos Casas/Sebastian Escofet (ES/AR) Siberian Fieldworks (Fieldworks#10)
 Charles Atlas/Chris Peck (US) The Intensity Police Are Working My Last Gay Nerve
 Milanese(Stephen Whetman) (UK) (by PDF)
 David Lynch (US) Inland Empire
 Invernomuto/Moira Ricci (IT) Bissera
 Opificio Ciclope/Egle Sommacal (IT) Rapsodia della Santa Muerte
 Armin Linke/Carl Michael von Hausswolff (IT/SE) Details
 Roberto Mendoza (MX)
 Glimpse (UK)
 Robert Babicz (DE)
 Will Guthrie (AU)
 Mattin (ES)
 Thomas Ankersmit (NL)
 Philip Jeck (UK)

Netmage 2008
Venues:
Palazzo Re Enzo • Appartamento privato - Bologna  • Piazza del Municipio - Ferrara

Artists:
 

 Visomat Inc./Errorsmith (DE)  Halbzeug - Surface RefinementDerek
 Derek Holzer/Sara Kolsterr (US/NL) Tonewheels
 Nastro Mortal (IT)
 VON (ES/IT) - Choir
 Pita/Jade (GB/AT)
 Anaisa Franco/Theo Firmo (BR/ES)
 Jade Boyd/Simona Barbera (AU/IT-NL) Overground
 Dafne Boggeri/Rhythm King And Her Friends (IT/DE) You can wake up now, the universe has ended
 Olyvetty (aka Riccardo Benassi,Claudio Rocchetti) (IT) Nights Erase Days Erase Nights
 Chelpa Ferro (BR)
 Russell Haswell/Florian Hecker (UK/DE) UPIC Diffusion #15, #16
 Ricardo Caballero (MX)
 emiter_francza (aka Marcin Dymiter,Ludomir Franczak) (PL)
 Luka Dekleva, Luka Princic, Miha Ciglar (SL) FeedForward Cinema
 Safy Sniper (DE-IL)
 Doravideo (JP)
 Julieta Aranda (MX)
 Mylicon/EN (IT)
 Demons, Prurient/ Carlos Giffoni (US/VE)
 REV99 (aka 99 Hooker/Jin Hi Kim) (US, KR)
 Silver Apples with Bec Stupak (US) Joshua Light Show
 Los Super Elegantes (aka Milena Muzquiz and Martiniano Lopez Crozet) (MX/AR)
 Paul Kalkbrenner (DE)
 Ben Klock (DE)
 ZAPRUDER filmmakersgroup (IT) DAIMON  (Cinema da camera/Anaglyph projection)
Edwin van der Heide, Edwin van der Heide (NL) Pneumatic Sound Field
 Mirco Santi, Andrea Belfi (IT) Stilllivingrooms

Netmage 2009
Venue:
Palazzo Re Enzo

Artists:

 Pete Swanson/John Wiese/Liz Harris (US)
 Pierre Bastien (FR)
 ATAK NIGHT: Keiichiro Shibuya/Evala (JP)
 Growing (US)
 Keiji Haino (JP)
 Invernomuto (IT)
 Sunburned Hand of the Man (US)
 Emeralds (US)
 Németh/Lotte Schreiber (AT)
 Andrea Dojmi/Flushing Device (IT)
 Mudboy (US)
 Black Dice (US)
 The Skaters /Roland Lethem (US/BE)
 Pascal Battus/Kamel Maad (FR)
 Mattin/" " [sic] Goldie (ES/GB)
 Thomas Ankersmit/Valerio Tricoli (NL/IT)
 Virgilio Villoresi/Dominique Vaccaro/Angstarbeiter (IT)
 Camilla Candida Donzella(IT)
 Bock & Vincenzi (GB)

Netmage 2010
Venue:
Palazzo Re Enzo

Artists:

 Rachida Ziani/Dewi de Vree (NL/FR) Elektrolab
 Francesco Cavaliere/Marcel Türkowsky (IT/DE)
 Harappian Night Recordings (UK)
 The Hunter Gracchus (UK)
 Lee Hangjun/Hong Chulki (KR)
 My Cat Is An Alien (IT)
 Ectoplasm Girls (SE)
 The Magic State (SE)
 Be Maledetto Now (IT)
 Richard Lainhart (US)
 Cluster (DE)
 Canedicoda (IT)
 Nassa (Nadow Assor/Surabhi Saraf) (US)
 André Gonçalves (PT)
 Es (FN)
 Margareth Kammerer/Andrea Belfi/Stefano Pilia/Daniela Cattivelli/Michaela Grill (IT/DE/AT)
 Carlos Casas (ES)
 Vincent Dupont (FR)
 Nana April Jun (SE)
 Aaron Dilloway (US)

Netmage 2011
Venue:
Palazzo Re Enzo

Artists:

 Massimiliano Nazzi (IT) Life Kills
 Barokthegreat/Michiel Klein  (IT/NL) Russian Mountains
 Zapruder  (IT) Criptofonia
 Gaëtan Bulourde/Olivier Toulemonde  (FR/DE)  Not every object used to nail is a hammer
 Calhau!  (PT) Quadrologia Pentacònica
 James Ferraro (US) Toilet Toad T.V. Overdrive
 Bruce McClure (US) Se Volessi Fare Un Fuoco Che Seza Dano Infuocherebbe Una Sala, Farai Cosi
 Cao Guimarães/O Grivo (BR)
 Ries Straver/Adam Lieber (NL/SA) Mute Dog Loffa
 Thomas Köner/Jürgen Reble  (DE) Camera Obscura
 Home Movies /In Zaire (IT) Paper Mache
 Luke Fowler/Keith Rowe/Peter Todd (UK) The Room
 Prince Rama (US) I Want My Life Back
 Pippi Langstrumpf (IT)

See also

List of electronic music festivals
Video Art
Performance Art
Sound Art
Expanded Cinema
New Media
Internet Art
Noise Music
Subculture
Creative Class

References

External links 
Netmage Festival Official Website
Xing Official Website
Bologna Contemporanea
Terrazze. Artisti, storie, luoghi in Italia negli anni zero

Music festivals established in 2000
Winter festivals
Digital art
Contemporary art
Art biennials
Art exhibitions in Italy
Dance festivals in Italy
2000 establishments in Italy
Electronic music festivals in Italy
New media art festivals